Timothy Terrill Stracka (born September 27, 1959) is a former American football tight end in the National Football League. He played for the Cleveland Browns (1983–1984). He played at the collegiate level at the University of Wisconsin–Madison; before that, Stracka was the star of Madison West High School's 1977 Division 1 Wisconsin state champion football team. Stracka is currently Founding Principal, Director-Institutional Sales at 1492 Capital Management in Milwaukee, Wisconsin.

References

1959 births
Living people
Sportspeople from Madison, Wisconsin
Players of American football from Wisconsin
American football tight ends
Wisconsin Badgers football players
Cleveland Browns players
Madison West High School alumni